The Hispano-Suiza T49 was a car manufactured by the Spanish company Hispano-Suiza between 1924 and 1944. It was the Spanish version of the French H6B model. It had a 6-cylinder engine of 8,000 cm3, 160 hp and a maximum speed of 177 km / h. It featured four-wheel drum brakes, brake booster, and a three-speed gearshift with reverse.

In 1924 the T-49 prototype was tested by the company's president, Damián Mateu, who traveled from Barcelona to Paris with his driver on a two-day trip. With body type Coupé de Ville, The car was commissioned by the Spanish Royal House for the private service of Queen Maria Cristina.

The manufacturing was completely Spanish. The chassis (engine, mechanics, axles, wheels, front and control panel) was produced at  La Sagrera factory in December 1925. 

The bodywork was designed by order. The main bodybuilders were Fiol, Farré, Roca and Badia, Mateu and Marrugat and others. They remained in the production program until 1934.

References

Related links 
Fédération Internationale des Véhicules Anciens
Hispano-Suiza vehicles
Luxury vehicles